Pediese  was a Chief of the Ma and a High Priest of Ptah under the Twenty-second Dynasty of Egypt, who was involved in the replacement of an Apis bull, which had died in the Year 28 of Shoshenq III, and again in the replacement of the subsequent Apis, in the Year 2 of Pami. Both the steles were found in the Serapeum of Saqqara and both are now in The Louvre.

His son Peftjauawybast succeeded him as High Priest of Ptah.

References

Bibliography
Kenneth Anderson Kitchen, The Third Intermediate Period in Egypt, 1100-650 B.C., Aris & Phillips 1986, §§81f., 155, 301

Chiefs of the Ma
Memphis High Priests of Ptah
People of the Twenty-second Dynasty of Egypt
9th-century BC clergy
8th-century BC clergy